Adams Peak is a peak, on the east side of Starshot Glacier, rising  south of Heale Peak in the Surveyors Range. Named by the New Zealand Geological Survey Antarctic Expedition (NZGSAE) (1960–61) for C.W. Adams, one of the early New Zealand surveyors, who in 1883 established the Mount Cook (Wellington) latitude which became the fundamental position for all New Zealand surveys up to 1949.

Amundsen Coast
Mountains of the Ross Dependency